Eedu Gold Ehe is a Telugu comedy film directed by Veeru Potla starring Sunil, Sushma Raj, and Richa Panai in lead roles. It was produced by Ramabrahmam Sunkara, under AK Entertainments, while Mahathi Swara Sagar scored the music. The movie was based on Jewel Thief.

Plot 
Bangarraju (Sunil) is an innocent and good-hearted person who goes from Vijayawada to Hyderabad in search of a job.  He lands in trouble because of a lookalike who robs a diamond-studded idol from a mafia don's house.

Cast 
 Sunil as Bangarraju
 Sushma Raj as Geeta
 Richa Panai as Sanjana
 Naresh as Buchchaiah Chowdary
 Jayasudha
 Puneet Issar as Mahadev
 Posani Krishna Murali
 Raja Ravindra
 Banerjee
 Aravind Krishnan as Sahadev
 Prudhviraj as Narada
 Vennela Kishore as D R Vaas alias Doorvas, Railway TC
 Prabhas Sreenu
 Ananth Babu
 Shatru
 Shakalaka Shankar as Ranga
 Sattenna as Narada's servant
 Master Bharath as Gopal

Soundtrack
The music was composed by Saagar Mahati and released by Aditya Music.

Release

References

External links 
 

2010s Telugu-language films
2010s comedy thriller films
2010s heist films
Indian comedy thriller films
Indian heist films
2016 comedy films
Films set in Vijayawada
Films shot in Vijayawada